Lehmus is a Finnish surname, meaning "linden" in Finnish.

Geographical distribution
As of 2014, 78.1% of all known bearers of the surname Lehmus were residents of Finland (frequency 1:9,746), 6.4% of Estonia (1:28,732), 5.8% of Sweden (1:234,447), 3.7% of Germany (1:2,971,431), 2.2% of Switzerland (1:513,249), 1.8% of the United States (1:27,788,560) and 1.2% of France (1:7,389,729).

In Finland, the frequency of the surname was higher than national average (1:9,746) in the following regions:
 1. Pirkanmaa (1:3,718)
 2. Southwest Finland (1:5,937)
 3. Tavastia Proper (1:6,190)
 4. Uusimaa (1:7,768)
 5. Satakunta (1:8,894)
 6. Central Ostrobothnia (1:9,553)

People
C. L. Lehmus (1780–1863), German mathematician
Steiner–Lehmus theorem
Emilie Lehmus (1841–1932), German physician, nephew of C. L. Lehmus
Juho Lehmus (1858–1918), Finnish shoemaker and politician
Väinö Lehmus (1886–1936), Finnish stage, film and radio actor

References

Finnish-language surnames
Surnames of Finnish origin